Presidential elections were held in Haiti on 20 November 2016, after having been postponed several times.

The elections were overseen by the Provisional Electoral Council (CEP), and were held using the two-round system, with a second round scheduled for 29 January 2017 if no candidate received an absolute majority of the votes in the first round (50% plus one vote). However, on 27 November election officials announced that, according to preliminary results, Jovenel Moïse had won the election in the first round with more than 50% of the vote. Voter turnout, in the election held 6 weeks after Hurricane Matthew hit Haiti, was reported to be 21%.

Jovenel Moïse assumed office on 7 February 2017, and was assassinated on 7 July 2021.

Background

Following massive protests arising from the 2015 election, the runoff election originally scheduled to be held on 27 December 2015 was postponed several times, with the last one scheduled to be held in October 2016. However, the Conseil Electoral Provisoire (CEP) announced on 5 April 2016 that fresh elections would be held on 9 October with a possible runoff on 8 January 2017. The first round planned for 9 October was subsequently postponed due to the passage of Hurricane Matthew.

Electoral system
The President of Haiti is elected using the two-round system, with a second round held if no candidate wins a majority of the vote in the first round.

Candidates
A total of 27 candidates ran for president, but only six actively campaigned and were seen as serious contenders: Edmonde Supplice Beauzile (Fusion Social Democrats), Jean-Henry Céant (Renmen Ayiti, "Love Haiti"), Jude Célestin (LAPEH/Peace), Jean-Charles Moïse (Pitit Dessalines), Jovenel Moïse (Parti Haïtien Tèt Kale), and Maryse Narcisse (Fanmi Lavalas). Each of the six, except for Beauzile, "have had strong ties to one or more of the former elected presidents: Michel Martelly, René Préval and Jean-Bertrand Aristide."

Opinion polls

Results
Supporters of Maryse Narcisse claimed early reports indicated a close race between her and Jovenel Moïse. While counting was still ongoing, both Moïse's Haitian Tèt Kale Party (PHTK) party and Narcisse's Fanmi Lavalas party claimed victory, although official results were not yet issued and the CEP's cautioned against making such claims.

Jovenel Moïse won more than double the votes of any other candidate and more than half of all votes, avoiding the need for a second round.

Reactions
The United States, Haiti's largest international donor, welcomed the holding of elections. U.S. Department of States spokesman John Kirby said following the first round that the U.S. viewed the elections "as an important step toward returning Haiti to fill constitutional rule and addressing the serious challenges the country faces," but noted that the election had some "isolated incidents of violence and intimidation."

References

Haiti
2016 in Haiti
November 2016 events in North America
Presidential elections in Haiti